is a Japanese retired football player.

Club statistics
Updated to 23 February 2019.

References

External links

1986 births
Living people
Association football people from Kagoshima Prefecture
Japanese footballers
J2 League players
J3 League players
Japan Football League players
Shonan Bellmare players
Roasso Kumamoto players
Kagoshima United FC players
Association football midfielders